Maurice Roy Hurst Jr. (born May 9, 1995) is an American football defensive tackle for the Cleveland Browns of the National Football League (NFL). He played college football at Michigan, and was drafted by the Oakland Raiders in the fifth round of the 2018 NFL Draft.

Early years
Hurst grew up in Canton, Massachusetts where he was raised by his mother Nicole Page. He is the son of former New England Patriot Maurice Hurst  He graduated from Xaverian Brothers High School in Westwood, Massachusetts where he was a three-year starter for the varsity football team, playing on the varsity team as a freshman.  Hurst was a two-time first-team all-state player in Massachusetts during the 2011 and 2012 seasons and participated in the 2013 Semper Fidelis All-American Bowl.

College career

In 2014, Hurst earned his first varsity letter after appearing in seven games.  On October 15, 2015, the Maxwell Football Club added Hurst to the Chuck Bednarik Award Watch List. On September 24, 2016, Hurst was a Pro Football Focus College Big Ten Team of the Week honoree for his six tackles and 1 sack performance against Penn State.  Hurst garnered Academic All-Big Ten recognition in 2014 and 2015.

During the 2017 season, Hurst set a career high in tackles with 59, while his 13.5 tackles for loss ranked sixth in the conference. Following the 2017 season, Hurst was named to the All-Big Ten defensive first-team by both the coaches and the media.

Professional career

Hurst was invited to the 2018 NFL Combine, but could not participate after being diagnosed with a heart condition. Despite the condition, he was cleared to play football and participate in Michigan's pro day.

Oakland / Las Vegas Raiders

2018
Hurst was projected to be anywhere from the top 5 to a mid first-round pick, but due to his heart condition, his draft stock plummeted. He was drafted by the Oakland Raiders in the fifth round (140th overall) of the 2018 NFL Draft. In Week 2 of his rookie season, he recorded his first career sack against the Denver Broncos. In Week 4 against the Cleveland Browns, Hurst sacked quarterback Baker Mayfield in a 45–42 overtime win. In Week 10 against the Los Angeles Chargers, Hurst made his third sack of the season off quarterback Philip Rivers in a 20–6 loss. In Week 11 against the Arizona Cardinals, Hurst sacked Josh Rosen in a 23–21 win. He received an overall grade of 72.4 from Pro Football Focus in 2018, which ranked as the 46th highest grade among all qualifying interior defenders.

2019
In week 5 against the Chicago Bears, Hurst sacked quarterback Chase Daniel twice in the 24–21 win. In week 9 against the Detroit Lions, Hurst recovered a fumble lost by Matthew Stafford in the 31–24 win. In week 11 against the Cincinnati Bengals, Hurst recovered a fumble forced by teammate Maxx Crosby on Ryan Finley in the 17–10 win. In week 14 against the Tennessee Titans, Hurst recorded his first career interception off a pass thrown by Ryan Tannehill and made a 55-yard return during the 42–21 loss.

2020
Hurst was placed on the reserve/COVID-19 list by the Raiders on October 6, 2020, and activated from the list on October 20. Hurst was waived after the season on April 15, 2021.

San Francisco 49ers
On April 23, 2021, Hurst signed a one-year contract with the San Francisco 49ers. He was placed on injured reserve on September 1, 2021. He was activated from injured reserve on October 2.

On March 10, 2022, Hurst re-signed with the 49ers. He was released by the team on April 11, but re-signed on a one-year deal the same day. He was placed on injured reserve on August 1, 2022 with a torn bicep, ending his season.

References

External links
Michigan Wolverines bio
twitter

1995 births
Living people
All-American college football players
American football defensive tackles
Michigan Wolverines football players
Las Vegas Raiders players
Oakland Raiders players
San Francisco 49ers players
People from Canton, Massachusetts
People from Westwood, Massachusetts
Players of American football from Massachusetts
Xaverian Brothers High School alumni